The 1909 South Australian Football League season was the 33rd season of the top-level Australian rules football competition in South Australia.

 won their 2nd SAFL premiership.

Ladder

References 

SAFL
South Australian National Football League seasons